Boris Mikhailov may refer to:

 Boris Mikhailov (Comintern), representative of the Communist International to the US in 1929-30
 Boris Mikhailov (photographer) (born 1938), fine art photographer
 Boris Mikhailov (ice hockey) (born 1944), former Soviet international ice hockey player
 Borislav Mihaylov (born 1963), President of the Bulgarian Football Union, and former Bulgarian international

it:Boris Mikhailov